In mathematics, the Gaussian binomial coefficients (also called Gaussian coefficients, Gaussian polynomials, or q-binomial coefficients) are q-analogs of the binomial coefficients.

Definition

The Gaussian binomial coefficients are defined by:

where m and r are non-negative integers.  If , this evaluates to 0.  For , the value is 1 since both the numerator and denominator are empty products.

Although the formula at first appears to be a rational function, it actually is a polynomial, because the division is exact in Z[q]

Dividing out these factors gives the equivalent formula

In terms of the q factorial , the formula can be stated as

Substituting  into  gives the ordinary binomial coefficient .

The Gaussian binomial coefficient has finite values as :

Examples

Combinatorial descriptions

Inversions

One combinatorial description of Gaussian binomial coefficients involves inversions.

The ordinary binomial coefficient  counts the -combinations chosen from an -element set. If one takes those  elements to be the different character positions in a word of length , then each -combination corresponds to a word of length  using an alphabet of two letters, say  with  copies of the letter 1 (indicating the positions in the chosen combination) and  letters 0 (for the remaining positions).

To obtain the Gaussian binomial coefficient , each word is associated with a factor , where  is the number of inversions of the word, where, in this case, an inversion is a pair of positions where the left of the pair holds the letter 1 and the right position holds the letter 0.

With the example above, there is one word with 0 inversions, one word with 1 inversion, two words with 2 inversions, one word with 3 inversions, and one word with 4 inversions, . This is also the number of left-shifts of the 1s from the initial position.

Another way to see this is to associate each word with a path across a rectangular grid with height   and width , going from the bottom left corner to the top right corner. The path takes a step right for each 0 and a step up for each 1. An inversion switches the directions of a step (right+up becomes up+right and vice versa), hence the number of inversions equals the area under the path.

Balls into bins

Let  be the number of ways of throwing   indistinguishable balls into  indistinguishable bins, where each bin can contain up to  balls.   
The Gaussian binomial coefficient can be used to characterize . 
Indeed,

Properties

Reflection

Like the ordinary binomial coefficients, the Gaussian binomial coefficients are center-symmetric, i.e., invariant under the reflection :

In particular,

Limit at q = 1

i.e. the sum of the coefficients gives the corresponding binomial value.

Analogs of Pascal's identity

The analogs of Pascal's identity for the Gaussian binomial coefficients are:

and

When , these both give the usual binomial identity.

The first Pascal analog allows computation of the Gaussian binomial coefficients recursively (with respect to m ) using the initial values

and also shows that the Gaussian binomial coefficients are indeed polynomials (in q).

The second Pascal analog follows from the first using the substitution  and the invariance of the Gaussian binomial coefficients under the reflection .

These identities have natural interpretations in terms of linear algebra. Recall that  counts r-dimensional subspaces , and let  be a projection with one-dimensional nullspace .

Proofs of the analogs

As

Equation becomes:

and substituting equation gives the first analog.

A similar process, using

instead, gives the second analog.

q-binomial theorem

There is an analog of the binomial theorem for q-binomial coefficients, known as the Cauchy binomial theorem:

Like the usual binomial theorem, this formula has numerous generalizations and extensions; one such, corresponding to Newton's generalized binomial theorem for negative powers, is

In the limit , these formulas yield

and

.

Setting  gives the generating functions for distinct and any parts respectively. (See also Basic hypergeometric series.)

Central q-binomial identity

With the ordinary binomial coefficients, we have:

With q-binomial coefficients, the analog is:

Applications

Gaussian binomial coefficients occur in the counting of symmetric polynomials and in the theory of partitions. The coefficient of qr in

is the number of partitions of r with m or fewer parts each less than or equal to n. Equivalently, it is also the number of partitions of r with n or fewer parts each less than or equal to m.

Gaussian binomial coefficients also play an important role in the enumerative theory of projective spaces defined over a finite field. In particular, for every finite field Fq with q elements, the Gaussian binomial coefficient

counts the number of k-dimensional vector subspaces of an n-dimensional vector space over Fq (a Grassmannian).  When expanded as a polynomial in q, it yields the well-known decomposition of the Grassmannian into Schubert cells.  For example, the Gaussian binomial coefficient

is the number of one-dimensional subspaces in (Fq)n (equivalently, the number of points in the associated projective space).  Furthermore, when q is 1 (respectively −1), the Gaussian binomial coefficient yields the Euler characteristic of the corresponding complex (respectively real) Grassmannian.

The number of k-dimensional affine subspaces of Fqn is equal to

.

This allows another interpretation of the identity

as counting the (r − 1)-dimensional subspaces of (m − 1)-dimensional projective space by fixing a hyperplane, counting such subspaces contained in that hyperplane, and then counting the subspaces not contained in the hyperplane; these latter subspaces are in bijective correspondence with the (r − 1)-dimensional affine subspaces of the space obtained by treating this fixed hyperplane as the hyperplane at infinity.

In the conventions common in applications to quantum groups, a slightly different definition is used; the quantum binomial coefficient there is
.

References 

Exton, H. (1983), q-Hypergeometric Functions and Applications, New York:  Halstead Press, Chichester: Ellis Horwood, 1983, 
  (undated, 2004 or earlier).
 Ratnadha Kolhatkar, Zeta function of Grassmann Varieties (dated January 26, 2004)
 
 
 
 
 
 
 
 
 
 
 
 
 
  (2009).

Q-analogs
Factorial and binomial topics